Stephen Finfer is a music publisher, manager, attorney, television producer, and business executive whose clients have included Kara DioGuardi, Scott Storch, Selena Quintanilla, Emanuel Kiriakou, David Hodges, Greg Wells, Mitch Allan, and Kasia Livingston. Having previously operated his own law firm and management company, Stephen Finfer aided Dr. Dre and Master P in establishing their respective record labels, Death Row Records and No Limit Records. Together with business partner DioGuardi, he formed and currently operates the boutique music publishing company, Arthouse Entertainment.

Early life
Stephen Finfer was born in Brooklyn, and grew up in Long Island, New York.  He is a graduate of Brandeis University and the Benjamin N. Cardozo School of Law.  He is admitted to practice law in the state of California.

He began his career as an entertainment litigator at the worldwide law firm of Shea & Gould in Los Angeles, before becoming a staff attorney at Capitol/EMI Music, where he ran business affairs for their licensing division (CEMA Special Markets), and Latin music division (EMI/Latin Music).  Thereafter, Finfer opened his own law firm and management company, where his clients included Dr. Dre/Death Row Records, Master P/No Limit Records, Capitol Records, Priority Records, LOUD Records, Justin Warfield, Everlast of House of Pain, and Selena Quintanilla. As a manager, Finfer's Deluxe Management banner represented such artists as Fleetwood Mac and Ian Astbury.

Career
After holding legal and business affairs positions in his early career, Finfer moved on to senior creative and management positions throughout the music industry. He was appointed General Manager of MCA Music Publishing in 1996. Thereafter, he served as Senior Director of Creative Affairs at Famous Music Publishing (a division of Paramount Pictures).

In 2000, Finfer was appointed General Manager of TVT Music's new publishing operation.  The company obtained worldwide pop success, with songs written by artists such as Scott Storch, Lil Jon, and Ja Rule.

Arthouse Entertainment
In 2002, Stephen Finfer and Kara DioGuardi established Arthouse Entertainment, a music publishing and production company.  Based in Los Angeles, Arthouse became a successful boutique publishing company, and retained several successful pop songwriters. The company has received more than 25 Pop music awards for the most performed songs on the radio.

In 2007, Arthouse Entertainment sold an equity interest in the company to Spectrum Equity/JPMorgan, and entered into an administration partnership with the publisher Bug Music. In 2012 Arthouse Entertainment sold a portion of its music assets to Roundhill Music for an undisclosed sum.  In August 2013, Arthouse entered into a funding and administration agreement with Universal Music Publishing Group.

Some of Arthouse's biggest hits include Bruno Mars' "Just The Way You Are", "Lazy Song", and "Grenade"; Jason Derulo's "Want You To Want Me", and "Trumpets"; Eminem's "The Monster", Demi Lovato's "Heart Attack",  Cee Lo Green's "Fuck You", Carrie Underwood's "Undo It", Darius Rucker's "This", Pink's "Sober", and B.o.B's "Nothin' On You".

Film and TV
In addition to his work in the music business, Stephen Finfer has produced for television. Finfer was signed on to produce various television projects including developing a music-comedy series "Big In Japan" for USA Networks.

Other management
Finfer runs his own personal talent management company. He has also consulted for various executives and entertainment companies, and renders creative services such as executive production and music supervision.

Footnotes

1962 births
Living people
People from Long Island
Brandeis University alumni
Yeshiva University alumni